Seyyedlar-e Sofla (also Romanized as Seyyedlar-e Soflá; also known as Seyyedlar-e Pā’īn) is a village in Seyyedan Rural District, Abish Ahmad District, Kaleybar County, East Azerbaijan Province, Iran. At the 2006 census, its population was 209, in 38 families.

References 

Populated places in Kaleybar County